Sami Ullah Chaudhary is a Pakistani politician who was the Provincial Minister of Punjab for Food, in office from 27 August 2018 till 6 April 2020. He had been a member of the Provincial Assembly of the Punjab from August 2018 till January 2023. Previously he was member of the Provincial Assembly of the Punjab from 1997 to 1999.

Early life and education
He was born on 21 October 1968 in Bahawalpur, Pakistan.

He received a degree of Bachelor of Commerce from Commerce College, Bahawalpur in 1989.

Political career
He was elected to the Provincial Assembly of the Punjab as a candidate of Pakistan Muslim League (N) (PML-N) from Constituency PP-222 (Bahawalpur-V) in 1997 Pakistani general election. He received 29,005 votes and Malik Habibullah Bhutta, a candidate of Pakistan Peoples Party (PPP).

He was re-elected to the Provincial Assembly of the Punjab as a candidate of Pakistan Tehreek-e-Insaf (PTI) from Constituency PP-246 (Bahawalpur-II) in 2018 Pakistani general election.

On 27 August 2018, he was inducted into the provincial Punjab cabinet of Chief Minister Sardar Usman Buzdar and was appointed as Provincial Minister of Punjab for food.

On 6 April 2020 he resigned as the Food Minister of Punjab following the FIA reports on sugar and flour crisis suggesting that the Punjab Food Ministry was inefficient in handling the sugar and flour crisis.

References

1968 births
Living people
Punjabi people
Pakistan Muslim League (N) MPAs (Punjab)
Pakistan Tehreek-e-Insaf politicians
Pakistan Tehreek-e-Insaf MPAs (Punjab)
Provincial ministers of Punjab
Punjab MPAs 1997–1999
Punjab MPAs 2018–2023